Drax Project is the debut studio album by New Zealand band Drax Project, released in September 2019. The album follows the release of their single "Woke Up Late" (2017), which was re-released in early 2019 as a new version featuring Hailee Steinfeld. The band's collaboration with Six60, "Catching Feelings", was released as a single just prior to the album, and became a hit in Australia and New Zealand.

Production

The album was written and recorded primarily between 2017 and 2019. Many of the songs are inspired by their experiences of working full-time jobs while moonlighting as musicians. The album features four songs from the band's 2018 extended play Noon, including a new version of their single "Woke Up Late" featuring Hailee Steinfeld, and seven new songs. Most of the album's recording sessions were held in Los Angeles.

Release and promotion

The first single released from the album was "Woke Up Late" featuring Hailee Steinfeld, released in January 2019. Steinfeld was introduced to the original version of the song after the band toured with American singer Camila Cabello, and a member of Cabello's team showed the song to Steinfeld, who loved it. The "Woke Up Late" re-release was followed by "All This Time" in June, and a collaboration with New Zealand band Six60, "Catching Feelings" in September. After the release of the album, the song "Relax" was released as a single in February 2020. "Catching Feelings" was a hit in both Australia and New Zealand, and was certified 5× Platinum in New Zealand and double platinum in Australia.

Track listing

Credits and personnel

Credits adapted from Tidal.

Devin Abrams – co-producer (3–4, 6), producer (1–2, 9), songwriting (1–3, 8–9, 11)
Ferras Alqaisi – songwriting (6)
Matt Beachen – drums (1, 3–7), songwriting (1–11)
Rogét Chahayed – producer (5, 10), songwriting (5)
Taylor Dextor – producer (10)
Remy Gautreau – songwriting (7)
Chris Gehringer – mastering engineer (1, 3–6, 10)
Marlon Gerbes – songwriting (11)
Serban Ghenea – mixing (1)
Kyle Kelso – producer (8)
Richard Markowitz – songwriting (7)
Tony Maserati – mixing (4–6, 10)
Ben O'Leary – bass guitar (1, 3–7), songwriting (1–11)
Jordan Palmer – mixing (3), producer (3–4, 6), songwriting (4)
Vasilys Papageorgiou – songwriting (10)
Jacob Ray – producer (5), songwriting (5)
Wes Singerman – producer (10)
Shaan Singh – songwriting (1–11), vocals
Six60 – featured artist (11)
Brandon Skeie – songwriting (4)
Sarah Solovay – songwriting (3)
SmarterChild – producer (7)
Hailee Steinfeld – vocals (1)
Sam Thomson – bass (vocal) (1, 3–7), songwriting (1–11)
Matiu Walters – songwriting (11)
Aaron Zuckerman – songwriting (6)

Charts

Weekly charts

Year-end charts

Certifications

Release history

References

2019 debut albums
Albums produced by Rogét Chahayed
Pop albums by New Zealand artists